Margaret Barrand (née Margaret Semple) (born 1940) is a former English badminton international player and a former national champion.

Biography
Barrand became an English National doubles champion after winning the English National Badminton Championships mixed doubles title with Roger Mills in 1965. The following year she won the women's doubles with Angela Bairstow. She was a member of the 1963 English Uber Cup team which finished second to the United States in a tight four games to three final. Her most impressive badminton accomplishment, perhaps, was winning mixed doubles at the U.S. Open Badminton Championships in three successive years (1963, 1964, and 1965), each time with a different partner ( in order: Sangob Rattanusorn, Channarong Ratanaseangsuang, and Bob McCoig). She also won the 1965 Canadian Open mixed doubles with McCoig  and the 1965 U.S Open women's doubles with Jennifer Pritchard Horton.

She represented Lancashire and England and played under the name of Semple until she married a vicar called George Barrand in 1958, playing thereafter as Barrand.

Achievements

International tournaments 
Mixed doubles

References 

English female badminton players
1940 births
Living people